Feel The Spirit is the fourth solo album by Leroy Hutson. It was released February 1976 on Curtom Records.
Feel The Spirit was the second album released during Hutson's creative peak, and widely considered to be his best.

Track listing 

"It's The Music" (Leroy Hutson, Stephan Harris)  4:50
"Let's Be Lonely Together" (Leroy Hutson, Donnell Hagan, Michael Hawkins)  3:32
"Never Know What You Can Do (Give It a Try)" (Leroy Hutson, Michael Hawkins)  3:57
"Lover's Holiday" (Leroy Hutson, Michael Hawkins)  3:47
"Feel The Spirit ('76)" (Leroy Hutson)  5:54
"Don't Let It Get Next to You" (Leroy Hutson, Michael Hawkins)  3:39
"Butterfat" (Steve Khan)  7:16

Personnel 
Leroy Hutson - Lead Vocals, Clavinet, Synthesizer (Arp), Piano (Bass)
Craig McMullen, Phil Upchurch, Stephan Harris - Guitar
Donnell Hagan - Drums, Percussion, Backing Vocals
Benny Scott, Richard Evans - Bass
Alfonso Surrett - Backing Vocals, Keyboards
Aaron Jamal, Michael Hawkins - Keyboards
Cordell Carter - Drums
Tony Carpenter- Congas
Bill McFarland - Trombone
Michael Harris, Steve Hawkins - Trumpet
Jerry Wilson - Alto Saxophone, Tenor Saxophone
Arnold Blair, Eulaulah Hathaway, Janice Hutson, Joe D. Reaves, Kitty Heywood Singers - Backing Vocals
Richard Fegley - photography

Charts

Singles

References

External links 
 Leroy Hutson-Feel The Spirit at Discogs

1976 albums
Leroy Hutson albums
Curtom Records albums